The Taichung Bank Club is a Taiwanese volleyball club. They have represented Chinese Taipei in international club volleyball competitions.

Their men's team has won the 2015 Asian Men's Club Volleyball Championship without losing a single match, beating Qatari club Al-Arabi in the final, thus qualifying for the 2016 FIVB Volleyball Men's Club World Championship.

They participated at the 2016 Asian Women's Club Volleyball Championship under the name "T. Grand".

Roster
2016 Asian Women's Club Volleyball Championship

Head coach:  Lo Chung-jen

Honors
Asian Men's Club Volleyball Championship
Champions: 2015

References

Taichung Bank
Taiwanese volleyball clubs